Admiral (stylized to resemble pre-revolutionary Russian,) is a 2008 biopic about Alexander Kolchak, a vice admiral in the Imperial Russian Navy and leader of the anti-communist White movement during the Russian Civil War. The film also depicts the love triangle between the Admiral, his wife, and the poet Anna Timiryova.

An extended version of the movie was made into a 10-part TV mini-series which was shown by Channel One in 2009.

Plot 
During the production of War and Peace at Mosfilm in 1964, an elderly Russian noblewoman is set to appear as an extra. The film's political commissar demands her dismissal due to her aristocratic background, but director Sergei Bondarchuk is adamant that she stays.

Kolchak leads his men in Russian Orthodox prayers for protection as they lure the German ship towards their mines and it sinks. At the naval base in the Grand Duchy of Finland, Kolchak is promoted to rear admiral and introduced to Anna Timiryova, the wife of subordinate officer and close friend Captain Sergei Timirev. Although Sergei reminds his wife, that they took vows before God, Anna is unmoved and wants nothing more than to be with the Admiral. Terrified of losing Kolchak, Sofya offers to leave for Petrograd, but Kolchak is adamant about their marriage. When Anna delivers a letter to Kolchak he informs her that they can never meet, professing his love for her.

Tsar Nicholas II personally promotes Kolchak to vice admiral and commander of the Black Sea Fleet at Sevastopol. After the February Revolution in 1917, Tsarist officers are disarmed and executed at the Kronstadt naval base. Sergei barely escapes with Anna. A group of enlisted men arrive aboard Kolchak's flotilla demanding all officers surrender their arms. Kolchak orders his subordinates to obey and throws his own sword into the harbour.

Kolchak is summoned by Alexander Kerensky and offers to make him Minister of Defense. Kolchak accepts on the condition they restore old Imperial Army practices. Kerensky refuses and offers him exile in the United States, ostensibly because the Allies need him as an expert to take Constantinople by naval attack. Shortly after, his wife and son are rescued from their home in Crimea and whisked away to a British ship, just before the house is attacked by Red Guards.

In 1918, Anna and Sergei are travelling on the Trans-Siberian Railway when she learns Kolchak is setting up an anti-Bolshevik army in Omsk. Sergei is dismayed when Anna announces that she is leaving him and becomes a nurse in the Russian Civil War. Kolchak learns the Red Army is advancing on Omsk, he orders an evacuation and seizes Irkutsk as the new capital of anti-communist Russia.
Anna is recognized by a White officer who informs Kolchak; they meet and he vows never to leave her again, explaining he has asked Sofya for divorce. He proposes to Anna, but she insists that there is no need for marriage. Eventually, she relents and they are seen attending the Divine Liturgy together.

Meanwhile, Irkutsk is under the nominal control of French General Maurice Janin and the Czechoslovak Legion. With their defenses disintegrating, the Red Army offers a way out alive. As a result, General Janin agrees to hand over Kolchak. Kolchak and Anna are arrested by the Czechs and handed over to the Reds. Reinforcements, led by Kolchak's ally General Vladimir Kappel, eventually reach Irkutsk just in time to rescue Kolchak; however the offensive fails. Kolchak is put on trial by the Irkutsk soviet and executed with his former Prime Minister along the banks of the frozen Angara River. His last words are, "Send word to my wife in Paris that I bless our son". Their bodies are dumped into an opening in the ice, hewn up by the local Orthodox clergy for the Great Blessing of Waters on Theophany.

The story then returns to 1964 at Mosfilm. It is revealed that Anna is the noblewoman who appears as an extra in War and Peace. As she witnesses a rehearsal for one of the film's ballroom scenes, she recalls her first meeting with Kolchak, and her dreams of the formal dance she was never able to share with her beloved.

Epilogue 
 Anna was arrested numerous times following Kolchak's execution and survived nearly 40 years in the Gulag before her release in 1960. She died in Moscow in January 1975, aged 81.
 Sergei became a rear admiral commanding the White Russian Navy in Siberia before fleeing to China, where he captained Chinese steamers. He settled in Shanghai's White Russian community, where he died in 1932.
 Sophya Kolchak joined her son in exile in Paris. She died in the Longjumeau Hospital in 1956.
 Kolchak's son Rostislav fought with the Free French Forces during the Second World War. He died in Paris in 1965.

Cast 

 Konstantin Khabensky – Admiral Alexander Kolchak
 Sergey Bezrukov – General Vladimir Kappel
 Vladislav Vetrov –  Captain 
 Elizaveta Boyarskaya – Anna Timiryova
 Anna Kovalchuk – Sofia Kolchak
 Egor Beroev  – Mikhail Smirnov
 Richard Bohringer – General Maurice Janin
 Viktor Verzhbitsky – Alexander Kerensky
 Nikolai Burlyayev – Nicholas II of Russia
 Fyodor Bondarchuk – Director Sergei Bondarchuk
 Olga Ostroumova
 Nikolay Reutov
 Igor Savochkin
 Mikhail Eliseev

Themes 
According to director Andrei Kravchuk, "[The film is] about a man who tries to create history, to take an active part in history, as he gets caught in the turmoil. However, he keeps on struggling, he preserves his honour and his dignity, and he continues to love."

Actress Elizaveta Boyarskaya said of her character, "She was a woman of such force, of such will, with such magnanimity... I feel an amazing resemblance to her... When I read script, I was even a bit scared: because she has the same vision of history as me. All that can arrive at is me. And when I played Anna, I did not play, I was her. It is my epoch, my attitude regarding love."

After being asked about the film Doctor Zhivago, she stated, "The only thing that these two films share consists in the love which the Russian women can carry; it is a topic approached by many novels. They love up to the last drop of blood, till the most dreadful end, to the death; they are capable of leaving family and children for the love of the man which they have chosen."

Production 
The film had 210 shooting days. Work on the picture took four years. Principal photography lasted for a year-and-half with a two to three-month break. Locations included Moscow, Saint Petersburg, Sevastopol, Torzhok and Irkutsk. The twelve-minute battle scene took a month to shoot. Twenty-four thousand CGI shots were incorporated into the film. Khabensky had to wear an orthopedic corset due to poor posture.

Release and reception 
The first screening of the film took place on October 9, 2008. Reception of the movie by Russian critics was mixed.

Because Kolchak had been portrayed as a villain in Soviet historiography, the film encountered some controversy in Russia due to its reversal of roles. In the United States, Leslie Felperin of Variety wrote: "Strictly as a film, however, Admiral is entertaining enough in a retro Doctor Zhivago/War and Peace sort of way, with its big setpieces, lavish costumes and string-laden orchestral score. For all intents and purposes, pic reps a virtual mirror image of those old patriotic Soviet-era movies wherein the Reds were the heroes and the White Army the baddies."

Awards 

 MTV Russia Movie Awards
 Best Film
 Best Male Actor (Konstantin Khabensky)
 Best Actress (Elizaveta Boyarskaya)
 Best Spectacular Scene
Golden Eagle Award
 Best Male Actor (Konstantin Khabensky)
 Best Cinematography
 Best Costumes
 Best Sound

Soundtrack 
The main original song for the film, "Anna", is performed by Russian singer Victoria Dayneko and composed by Igor Matvienko. The poem itself was written by Anna Timireva in memory of the Admiral. "Vopreki" ("Despite") was written by Konstantin Meladze and performed by Valery Meladze.

References

External links 
 

2008 films
2000s biographical films
2000s historical films
2000s war films
2000s Russian-language films
Cultural depictions of Alexander Kolchak
Biographical films about military leaders
Russian historical films
Russian biographical drama films
Films directed by Andrei Kravchuk
Russian Civil War films
World War I naval films
Films set in the Baltic Sea
Films set in Siberia
World War I films based on actual events
Films about Soviet repression
Russian Revolution films
World War I films set on the Eastern Front
Films set in 1916
Films set in 1917
Films set in 1918
Films set in 1919
Films set in 1920
Films set in 1964
Films shot in Crimea
Films shot in Moscow Oblast
Films shot in Saint Petersburg
Films shot in Siberia
Biographical action films
Historical action films
Russian war films
War romance films
2008 biographical drama films
Channel One Russia original programming
2009 Russian television series debuts
2009 Russian television series endings
2000s Russian television series
Russian television miniseries
Cultural depictions of Nicholas II of Russia
2008 drama films
Russian World War I films